Wolgarston High School is a coeducational upper school and sixth form located in Penkridge, Staffordshire, England. Wolgarston High School is an age 13 to 18 school, with Year 9 as the main year of entry. The school is smaller than most secondary schools, but with a relatively large sixth form. The great majority of students are from White British backgrounds. The proportions of students who have learning difficulties and/or disabilities or who are eligible for free school meals are both well below national averages. The proportion of students who have a statement of special educational needs is just below the national average. The proportion of students from minority ethnic backgrounds is much lower than the national average. The school has a Leading Parent Partnership award, an International School award and Healthy Schools status. It was redesignated as a Specialist Technology College in 2007. Since 2018 the school converted to academy status and is part of the Penk Valley Academy Trust.

References

External links 
Official website

Upper schools in Staffordshire
Academies in Staffordshire
Penkridge